A city with county rights (or urban county, Hungarian: megyei jogú város, MJV) is a level of administrative subdivision in Hungary. Since 1994 all county seats are automatically awarded this status, and since 2012 this is the only way a new city may become a city with county rights. However, all cities that achieved this rank before 2012 have retained their status and there is no law that provides for the revocation of this title. As such, cities like Hódmezővásárhely or Dunaújváros that are not county seats are still cities with county rights. From 2006 until 2022, there were 23 cities with county rights. Since May 2022, there are 25 cities with county rights. Before 1950, the former so-called cities with municipal rights (törvényhatósági jogú város) had a similar status as the present urban counties.

Budapest is not considered an urban county and has a special status among the other Hungarian cities.

Every city with county rights is allowed to be subdivided into districts. The representative body is the General Assembly (közgyűlés) which elects with the County Assembly a council that takes care of different tasks related to the county.

History 
Between 1954 and 1971, the four largest regional cities received the megyei jogú város title. These were Debrecen, Miskolc, Pécs and Szeged. Then, from 1971 to 1990, the four previous cities and Győr were granted a new status known as "county city" (megyei város). This status was also extended to three other cities in 1989: Salgótarján, Nyíregyháza and Kecskemét. After the end of Communism, this status was abolished and replaced by the urban counties as before 1971. The eight megyei város and twelve additional cities became megyei jogú város.

List

References

External links 
 Alliance of Cities with County Rights

 
Cities in Hungary
Populated places in Hungary